Baojun is a Chinese automobile marque owned by a joint venture of General Motors and SAIC Motor, SAIC-GM-Wuling Automobile.

History 
The Baojun marque was established in 2010 as a cheaper alternative to existing GM brands Chevrolet and Buick, which are also on sale in China. The company's products compete with domestic Chinese manufacturers such as Chery, Geely, Changan, Haval and Trumpchi.

The marque's first vehicle is the Baojun 630, a four-door sedan that has been produced since November 2010. Sales started in late 2011 through a dedicated dealer network.

The joint venture also offers a localized version of the Daewoo Matiz / Chevrolet Spark, known as the Baojun Lechi. In 2014, a third model (the Baojun 610) was announced at Auto China. At Auto Shanghai in 2015, the company introduced the Baojun 560 SUV. And in July 2014, SAIC-GM-Wuling launched the 730, a seven-seater MPV.

In its early years, sales of Baojun models have grown dramatically, reaching 688,390 units in 2016, and 996,629 in 2017.

The electrically powered Baojun E100, which is only 2.49 meters long, was initially only available in Guangxi from August 2017. Since June 2018, it has been available throughout China with an increased range.

The Van Baojun 360 went on sale in May 2018.

Since June 2018, Baojun has been offering the 530, a 4.66 meter long SUV.

Since September 2018, the Baojun E200, an electrically powered microcar, has been sold in China.

The Baojun RS-5, the brand's fourth SUV, was presented at the Guangzhou Auto Show in November 2018.

In June 2019, the Baojun RC-6 based on the RS-5 was introduced.

In September 2019, the Van Baojun RM-5 was introduced.

Baojun presented the RS-3 SUV at the end of October 2019.

In 2020, the E300 microcar, the RS-7 van and the RC-5 sedan were introduced.

In July 2021, the microcar KiWi EV based on the E300 Plus was introduced.

Products 

Baojun E100 — An electric city car.
Baojun E200 — An electric city car.
Baojun KiWi EV (formerly Baojun E300) — An electric city car.
Baojun Lechi — A rebadged Chevrolet Spark/Daewoo Matiz city car. Its crossover version is called the Lechi Cross.
Baojun Yep — An electric city car.
Baojun 310 — A subcompact car. Its estate version is called 310W, while the 330 is the sedan variation.
Baojun 360 — A compact MPV slotted below the 730.
Baojun 510 — A subcompact crossover SUV. It is sold under the Chevrolet brand as the Groove in Latin America, the Middle East, Africa and other emerging countries.
Baojun 530 — A compact crossover SUV, replacement for the 560. Sold as the Wuling Almaz in Indonesia, the Chevrolet Captiva in Latin America and Thailand, and the MG Hector in India.
Baojun 560 — A compact crossover SUV. It was replaced by the 530.
Baojun 610 / 630 — The Baojun 610 is a compact hatchback. A sedan version is called 630, sold globally as the Chevrolet Optra.
Baojun 730 — A compact MPV slotted above the 360. For the second-generation model, it is sold under the Wuling brand as the Cortez in Indonesia.
Baojun RC-5 —  Replaces the 630. Available in sedan and station wagon (RC-5W) bodystyles, it shares the platform with the RS-5 SUV.
Baojun RC-6 —  A high-riding mid-size car.
Baojun RS-3 —  A subcompact crossover SUV slotted below the RS-5 and replaces the 510.
Baojun RS-5 —  A compact crossover SUV slotted above the 530.
Baojun RS-7 —  A three-row mid-size crossover SUV slotted above the RS-5.
Baojun RM-5 —  A 5-/6-/7-seater compact MPV related to the RS-5 based on the RM-C Concept.
Baojun Valli

Gallery

See also 
 Electric vehicle industry in China

References

External links 

 Launched Affordable Baojun E100 Urban Electric Car In China At US$5300

 
SAIC-GM-Wuling
Car manufacturers of China
Chinese brands
General Motors marques
SAIC Motor brands
Vehicle manufacturing companies established in 2010
Chinese companies established in 2010
Electric car models